Area codes 309 and 861 are telephone area codes in the North American Numbering Plan (NANP) for the west-central part of the U.S. state of Illinois. The numbering plan area includes cities such as Bloomington, Canton, East Moline, East Peoria,  Galesburg, Kewanee, Macomb, Minonk, Moline, Morton, Normal, Pekin, Peoria, Rock Island, Silvis, and many smaller communities in west-central Illinois. Area code 309 was created in 1957 in an split of area code 815. 861 was added to the numbering plan area on February 24, 2023, in formation of an overlay.

History
When the American Telephone and Telegraph Company created the first nationwide telephone numbering plan for Operator Toll Dialing in 1947, the state of Illinois was divided into four numbering plan areas (NPAs), generally laid out as a southern, central, and northern area, and a region around the city of Chicago. The northern NPA was assigned area code 815 in the group of eighty-six original North American area codes.

In 1957, the 815 numbering plan area was divided roughly in half along a north-westerly to south-easterly running line, assigning area code 309 to its western part. The new area code was one of the first area codes not serving an entire state, but having the digit 0 in the middle position of the code. It was the only new area code created in Illinois between 1947 and the 1989 creation of area code 708.

On October 24, 2021, area code 309 was transitioned to ten-digit dialing, despite not being part of an overlay numbering plan, in which multiple area codes are assigned to a numbering plan area. The area code had telephone numbers assigned for the central office code 988. In 2020, 988 was designated nationwide as a dialing code for the National Suicide Prevention Lifeline, which created a conflict for exchanges that still permitted seven-digit dialing.

NANPA exhaust projections for 309 in 2021 determined an exhaustion date in late 2023. For mitigation, a new all-services distributed overlay was announced with the new area code 861, which commenced operation on February 24, 2023. The earliest date central office codes could be requested was December 20, 2022, but assignments are available only after all central office codes in area code 309 have been allocated.

Service area
Communities in the numbering plan area include:

Abingdon
Adair
Albany
Aledo
Alexis
Alpha
Altona
Anchor
Andalusia
Andover
Annawan
Armington
Arrowsmith
Astoria
Atkinson
Avon
Bardolph
Barstow
Bath
Bellflower
Benson
Berwick
Biggsville
Bishop Hill
Blandinsville
Bloomington
Bradford
Brimfield
Bryant
Buda
Buffalo Prairie
Bushnell
Cambridge
Cameron
Camp Grove
Canton
Carbon Cliff
Carlock
Carman
Castleton
Chillicothe
Coal Valley
Colchester
Colfax
Colona
Congerville
Cooksville
Cordova
Creve Coeur
Cropsey
Cuba
Dahinda
Danvers
Deer Creek
Delavan
Downs
Dumfermline
Dunlap
East Galesburg
East Moline
East Peoria
Easton
Edelstein
Edwards
El Paso
Ellisville
Ellsworth
Elmwood
Erie
Eureka
Fairview
Farmer City
Farmington
Fenton
Fiatt
Forest City
Galesburg
Galva
Geneseo
Gerlaw
Gilson
Gladstone
Glasford
Good Hope
Goodfield
Green Valley
Gridley
Groveland
Hampton
Hanna City
Havana
Henderson
Henry
Heyworth
Hillsdale
Hopedale
Hudson
Illinois City
Industry
Ipava
Joy
Keithsburg
Kewanee
Kilbourne
Kingston Mines
Kirkwood
Knoxville
La Fayette
La Rose
Lacon
Laura
Le Roy
Lewistown
Lexington
Little York
Littleton
Liverpool
London Mills
Low Point
Lynn Center
Mackinaw
Macomb
Manito
Mapleton
Maquon
Marietta
Matherville
Mc Lean
Media
Merna
Metamora
Milan
Mineral
Minier
Minonk
Moline
Monmouth
Morton
Mossville
Neponset
New Boston
New Windsor
Normal
Norris
North Henderson
Oneida
Oquawka
Orion
Osco
Pekin
Peoria
Peoria Heights
Plymouth
Port Byron
Prairie City
Preemption
Princeville
Rapids City
Raritan
Reynolds
Rio
Roanoke
Rock Island
Rome
Roseville
St. Augustine
St. David
San Jose
Saybrook
Siota
Seaton
Secor
Sherrard
Shirley
Silvis
Smithfield
Smithshire
South Pekin
Sparland
Speer
Stanford
Stronghurst
Table Grove
Taylor Ridge
Tennessee
Topeka
Toulon
Towanda
Tremont
Trivoli
Varna
Vermont
Victoria
Viola
Washburn
Washington
Wataga
Williamsfield
Woodhull
Wyoming
Yates City

See also
 List of Illinois area codes

References

External links

309
309
Telecommunications-related introductions in 1957